Ronald N. Lawruk is a Canadian author, best known for a trilogy of thriller novels.

External links
Lawruk's website 
Amazon listing for Lawruk's books 

Living people
1934 births
21st-century Canadian male writers